Beylikova, formerly Beylikahır, is a town and district of Eskişehir Province in the Central Anatolia region of Turkey. According to 2010 census, population of the district is 6,562 of which 3,157 live in the town of Beylikova.

Notes

References

External links
 Eskişehir governor's official website 
 Map of Beylikova district
 Local news website 

Towns in Turkey
Populated places in Eskişehir Province
Districts of Eskişehir Province